Villers-Écalles is a commune in the Seine-Maritime department in the Normandy region in northern France.

Geography
The confectionery company Ferrero has a factory here, employing 800 people to produce Nutella and Kinder Bueno.

Population

Places of interest
 The church of St. Jean, dating from the thirteenth century.
 The ruins of a fifteenth-century chateau with vaulted cellars.
 A seventeenth-century stone cross.

See also
Communes of the Seine-Maritime department

References

External links

Official commune website 

Communes of Seine-Maritime